Petar Porobić (Serbian Cyrillic: Петар Поробић; born 28 May 1957) is a Montenegrin professional water polo head coach. He has been the president of the World Water Polo Coaches Association (WWPCA) since 2015.

He was the head coach of the China women's national water polo team at the 2020 Summer Olympics in Tokyo, where the team finished in eighth place.

He will be the head coach of the Germany men's national water polo team on 1 October 2021.

See also
 List of world champions in men's water polo

References

External links
 

1957 births
Living people
People from Kotor
Yugoslav male water polo players
Montenegrin male water polo players
Montenegrin water polo coaches
Serbia and Montenegro men's national water polo team coaches
Water polo coaches at the 2004 Summer Olympics
Montenegro men's national water polo team coaches
Water polo coaches at the 2008 Summer Olympics
Water polo coaches at the 2016 Summer Olympics
China men's national water polo team coaches
China women's national water polo team coaches
Water polo coaches at the 2020 Summer Olympics
Germany men's national water polo team coaches